Yiliang County may refer to:

 Yiliang County, Kunming (宜良), Yunnan
 Yiliang County, Zhaotong (彝良), Yunnan